Dariusz Wosz (born 8 June 1969) is a German professional football coach and former player who is a technical trainer for German club VfL Bochum. As a player, he played mostly as a deep-lying playmaker in midfield.

Early life
Wosz's family migrated to Halle, Germany, from the Polish part of Silesia.

Club career
Wosz started playing football at BSG Motor Halle in 1980. After a year there he moved to BSG Empor Halle before joining Chemie Halle in 1984.

Two years after joining the club he made it into the first team, who earned promotion from the second division to the DDR-Oberliga, although Wosz would only play once, in 1986–87. During the following four seasons he would amass 93 games (15 goals) until the Oberliga merged with the Bundesliga due to the German reunification.

Wosz stayed at Halle for the 1991–92 2. Bundesliga season, lining up in 22 games (five goals). Because the club finished fourth in the final East German football season, he was able to play twice in the 1991–92 UEFA Cup.

Wosz was transferred to VfL Bochum in toward the end of the 1991–92 season. As captain, he led Bochum to its biggest success yet: the third round of the 1997–98 UEFA Cup which was lost 6–4 on aggregate to Ajax.

In the summer of 1998, Wosz was transferred to Hertha BSC. After three successful years, including participation in the UEFA Champions League where he scored the winning goal against A.C. Milan, he requested to be transferred back to Bochum, where he helped the side qualify for the 2004–05 UEFA Cup. During his final season, 2006–07, Wosz only played one match, being substituted on for Zvjezdan Misimović in the 70th minute against Borussia Mönchengladbach. Twelve minutes later he scored his final Bundesliga goal. In summer 2007, he played besides his coaching job with Bochum-based football club SC Union Bergen and retired in summer 2009.

International career
Wosz earned his first international cap for East Germany when he played against Finland on 22 March 1989 in Dresden. The match ended as a 1–1 draw. His seventh cap, his final game for East Germany, was against Belgium on 12 September 1990 in Brussels. East Germany won the match 2–1.

On 26 February 1997, he debuted for the reunified Germany against Israel in Tel Aviv. Germany won the match 1–0, with Wosz scoring Germany's goal. Wosz was part of the German squad for Euro 2000 but Erich Ribbeck did not use him during the tournament. He made his final national appearance against Denmark on 15 November 2000 in Copenhagen. Germany lost 2–1.

Coaching career
After retiring, Wosz served as Bochum's U-19 coach and was on 20 September 2009 named as assistant coach of the Bundesliga team. On 29 April 2010, he replaced Heiko Herrlich as head coach of VfL Bochum.

In the summer 2015, Wosz was appointed as the new technical trainer in the club, both for the seniors and the youth teams.

Background
Wosz is the only player of VfL Bochum who got a "Farewell-match". On 8 September 2007, a team formed by the UEFA Cup squad of Bochum played against a team of old teammates of Wosz. The match ended 12–8 and two goals of Wosz who played for both sides. 
By many supporters of VfL Bochum he is only called "him" (in German: er), after his return to the club.

Personal life
Wosz's nephew, Joscha Wosz, is also a professional footballer.

Career statistics

Club

International

Scores and results list Germany's goal tally first, score column indicates score after each Wosz goal.

Notes

References

External links
  
 
 
 

1969 births
Living people
German footballers
German people of Polish descent
East German footballers
1999 FIFA Confederations Cup players
UEFA Euro 2000 players
VfL Bochum players
VfL Bochum managers
Hertha BSC players
Polish emigrants to East Germany
Polish emigrants to Germany
Naturalized citizens of Germany
Germany international footballers
East Germany international footballers
Sportspeople from Halle (Saale)
Hallescher FC players
Dual internationalists (football)
Bundesliga players
2. Bundesliga players
Association football midfielders
People from Piekary Śląskie
Sportspeople from Silesian Voivodeship
2. Bundesliga managers
DDR-Oberliga players
Footballers from Saxony-Anhalt
German football managers
People from Bezirk Halle